Mălâncrav is a village in the commune of Laslea in Sibiu County, Transylvania, Romania. An asphalt road of 13 km leads to the village. In the formerly majority Transylvanian Saxon village, there still is a small community of Saxons.

The film Malmkrog (2020) has been named after the village and was shot at the Apafi manor.

The Saxon Romanesque Lutheran church has early 14th-century Gothic murals in the apse, with 15th-century murals in the nave and a 15th-century late Gothic altar. They constitute some of the most significant Gothic murals in Transylvania aside from those at Ghelința in Covasna County. In later centuries the Apafi family (descending from a certain Saxon man named Apa; later a leading Hungarian noble family in Transylvania) buried their dead in the church, since they had overlordship in the village. In 1902, the tomb chest of György Apafi, father of Mihaly Apafi, and his family was transferred to the Hungarian National Museum in Budapest.

The locality was not part of the autonomous Saxon territory, although it had a majority Saxon population until the 1970s.

Gallery

References

Populated places in Sibiu County
Gothic architecture in Romania